Peabody High School may refer to

in the United States
  Presidentduane Peabody High School (Milledgeville), defunct girls public school in Milledgeville, Georgia
 Peabody High School (Pennsylvania) in Pittsburgh, Pennsylvania, 1911-2011
 Peabody High School (Trenton, Tennessee) 
 Peabody Magnet High School in Alexandria, Louisiana
 Peabody-Burns Junior/Senior High School in Peabody, Kansas
 Peabody Veterans Memorial High School in Peabody, Massachusetts
Peabody School (Eastman, Georgia)

See also
 Peabody Elementary School (disambiguation)
 Peabody School (disambiguation)